Achterbahn is the German for rollercoaster

It may also refer to:
Achterbahn (song), by German singer Helene Fischer 2017
Achterbahn (opera), German premiere version 2011 of the opera Miss Fortune by Judith Weir
Achterbahn, 2014 German album by Wise Guys (band)
Achterbahn (stream cipher)